WDSO (88.3 FM, "The Rock") is a non-profit high school radio station located at Chesterton High School, in Chesterton, Indiana, with the transmitter at Chesterton High School.  All its disc jockeys are high school students, who are also responsible for the station's music selection and programming.

Format 
WDSO's radio format is variety, with the majority of its programming being rock music.  Outside of rock music, WDSO also broadcasts local news and covers high school sports.

History
In the fall semester of 2014, WDSO purchased a brand new Nautel VS-1 Transmitter to replace their old one, which was from 1985 when WDSO was permitted to change their power from 10 watts to 410 watts. This allowed for broadcast 24/7, 365 days per year, with 2015 being the first year the station broadcast continuously.

During the fall of 2018, WDSO purchased and installed an RDS unit, allowing listeners to see the song title and artist of the song currently playing, in their car.

In July 2020, WDSO's long time Operations Manager, Miss Michele Stipanovich died after working at the station for 39 years, being succeeded by Mrs. Emily Fletcher the following school year.

References

External links 
 WDSO FM Facebook
 

DSO
Radio stations established in 1976
High school radio stations in the United States
1976 establishments in Indiana